The Ministry of Social Solidarity is the government body responsible for providing social safety networks for Egypt's most vulnerable citizens. Nivine El-Qabbage is its current minister after the previous minister Ghada Waly. Its vision is to reduce the number of poor in the country by providing support and social safety nets.

Duties
NGOs and charities work hand in hand with the Ministry and do a large part of the social safety net work, however, after the 
June 2013 Egyptian protests and when Abdel Fattah el-Sisi became president, he stated NGOs had to be carefully vetted for national security reasons. Egypt was widely criticized for this.

In August 2013, the ministry began disbanding The Muslim Brotherhood.
In 2014, the ministry reported there were 600 NGOs operating in Egypt. The ministry required NGOs to show transparency and reveal where their funding came from. In 2016, the NGOs Act was passed and the ministry sent letters to NGOs requiring them to disclose activities a month and a half prior to said activities.  The NGOs Act passed in 2016 allowed the Ministry of Social Solidarity to disband NGOs but in June 2018, the Egyptian Supreme Constitutional Court stated that clause in the Act was unconstitutional and that the ministry did not have the right to disband NGOs.

Initiatives 
The ministry has developed a welfare system, to provide cash and support services to people in need, such as to orphans under 18, children of single mothers, previously imprisoned people, disabled citizens, elderly over 65, divorced women and widows.

In 2015, the ministry began its You Are Stronger Than Drugs campaign featuring football star Mohamed Salah. Again in 2018, the ministry in conjunction with the Ministry of Youth and Sports, launched an anti-addiction advertising campaign featuring Mohamed Salah, to encourage its young citizens to avoid illegal drug use.

Egypt's population explosion is being addressed by the ministry and the United Nations Population Fund (UNFPA) with a campaign begun in 2018 called two is enough to promote the use of birth control. The campaign is set to continue until 2030.

See also

 Cabinet of Egypt

References

External links
 Ministry of Social Solidarity on Facebook
 Ministry of Social Solidarity on YouTube
 Ministry of Social Solidarity on Twitter
 Egypt's Cabinet Database

Government ministries of Egypt